Euphaedra tenebrosa, the Côte d'Ivoire Ceres forester, is a butterfly in the family Nymphalidae. It is found in Guinea and Ivory Coast. The habitat consists of forests.

References

Butterflies described in 1983
tenebrosa